Eli John Tapscott (29 April 1928 – 1981) was an English footballer who played as a left half.

Career
Starting out at Leeds United, Tapscott would make no senior appearances there. He moved to Wrexham in 1950, where he'd make 172 league appearances in 6 years before moving to non-league Yeovil Town.

Tapscott died in 1981.

References

1928 births
1981 deaths
English footballers
English Football League players
Leeds United F.C. players
Wrexham A.F.C. players
Yeovil Town F.C. players
Association football midfielders